Menelaus is a young lunar impact crater located on the southern shore of Mare Serenitatis near the eastern end of the Montes Hæmus mountain range. Its diameter is 27 km. To the southwest is the small crater Auwers, and to the west-southwest is the even smaller Daubrée. To the northeast is a faint rille system named the Rimae Menelaus.

Description
The wall of Menelaus is slightly irregular in outline, with a high, sharp rim and terraced inner walls. The interior has a high albedo that is prominent under high sun angles. There are several ridges on the floor. It also has a moderate ray system, with the most prominent ray aligned to the north-northeast across the Mare Serenitatis. The location of this ray and slightly off-center central peak suggest an impact at a relatively low angle.

Names
Menelaus is named after the ancient Greek astronomer Menelaus of Alexandria. Like many of the craters on the Moon's near side, it was given its name by Giovanni Riccioli, whose 1651 nomenclature system has become standardized. Earlier lunar cartographers had given the feature different names. Michael van Langren's 1645 map calls it "Mariae Imp. Rom." after Maria Anna, the Holy Roman Empress. And Johannes Hevelius called it "Byzantium (urbs)" after the city of Byzantium.

Satellite craters
By convention these features are identified on lunar maps by placing the letter on the side of the crater midpoint that is closest to Menelaus.

The following craters have been renamed by the IAU.
 Menelaus S - See Daubrée.

References

External links

 LTO-42D3 Menelaus — L&PI topographic map
Small crater at the Southern Rim of Menelaus - Lunar Reconnaissance Orbiter page - featuring the photo, an interactive photo and information
 
 
  - includes the crater Menelaus

Impact craters on the Moon